University is a halt serving the University of Ulster at Coleraine in County Londonderry, Northern Ireland. It is within the townland of Ballysally in the north of Coleraine.

It is a single line halt on the Coleraine-Portrush railway line with a single platform and shelter and is unstaffed.

The halt is often extremely busy, given its proximity to the University. Portrush has a large number of students living in it and many of them use the train as transport. It is also used by many passengers to connect to the mainline station at Coleraine for onward journeys to Derry and Belfast.

It was opened on 12 June 1968.

Service
Monday to Friday, first two trains from Portrush are through trains to Great Victoria street then the rest of the day an hourly service operates to Coleraine and Portrush.

On Saturdays, the first train from Portrush is a through train to Great Victoria Street, then the rest of the day an hourly service operates to Coleraine and Portrush.

On Sunday, there is an hourly service to Portrush and Coleraine, with the service extending to Great Victoria street every two hours.

References

Railway stations in County Londonderry
Railway stations opened in 1968
Railway stations served by NI Railways
Railway stations opened by NI Railways
Ulster University
Coleraine
Railway stations at university and college campuses
Railway stations in Northern Ireland opened in the 20th century